Eckhard Pols (born 14 March 1962) is a German politician of the Christian Democratic Union (CDU) who was a member of the Bundestag from the state of Lower Saxony from 2009 to 2021.

Political career 
Pols became a member of the Bundestag in the 2009 German federal election. In parliament, he serves on the Committee on Transport and Digital Infrastructure and the Committee on Construction, Housing, Urban Development and Communities. In addition to his committee assignments, he is part of the German Parliamentary Friendship Group with Cyprus and Malta.

He lost his seat in the 2021 federal election.

Other activities 
 Foundation Flight, Expulsion, Reconciliation (SFVV), Member of the Board of Trustees

References

External links 

  
 Bundestag biography 

1962 births
Living people
Members of the Bundestag for Lower Saxony

Members of the Bundestag 2013–2017
Members of the Bundestag 2009–2013

Members of the Bundestag 2017–2021
Members of the Bundestag for the Christian Democratic Union of Germany